is a railway station in the city of Ueda, Nagano, Japan, operated by the private railway operating company Ueda Electric Railway.

Lines
Uedahara Station is served by the Bessho Line and is 2.9 kilometers from the terminus of the line at Ueda Station.

Station layout
The station consists of one ground-level island platform serving two tracks. The station is staffed during weekday morning and evening peak hours.

Platforms

History
Uedahara Station opened on 17 June 1921.

Station numbering was introduced in August 2016 with Uedahara being assigned station number BE05.

Passenger statistics
In fiscal 2015, the station was used by an average of 917 passengers daily (boarding passengers only).

Surrounding area

Site of the Battle of Uedahara
Grave of Itagaki Nobukata
Ueda Kawabe Elementary School
Ueda Minami Elementary School

See also
 List of railway stations in Japan

References

External links

 

Railway stations in Japan opened in 1921
Railway stations in Nagano Prefecture
Ueda Electric Railway
Ueda, Nagano